Milea is a village and a community of the Elassona municipality. Before the 2011 local government reform it was a part of the municipality of Sarantaporo, of which it was a municipal district. The 2011 census recorded 397 inhabitants in the village. The community of Milea covers an area of 12.628 km2.

Economy
The population of Milea is occupied in winery and agriculture.

History
Milea was named Vourmpa until 1957.

Population
According to the 2011 census, the population of the settlement of Milea was 397 people, a decrease of almost 14% compared with the population of the previous census of 2001.

See also
 List of settlements in the Larissa regional unit

References

Populated places in Larissa (regional unit)